Beel is a term for a pond (wetland) with static water.

Beel may also refer to:
Chalan Beel - a wetland in Bangladesh
Louis Beel (1902–1977), Prime Minister of the Netherlands (1946-1948, 1958–1959)

See also 
 Beal (disambiguation)
 Bheel (disambiguation)
 BIL (disambiguation)